Eddie Davis (born January 27, 1973) is a former defensive halfback who played 15 seasons in the Canadian Football League (CFL), mainly with the Saskatchewan Roughriders. He played his college football for Northern Illinois University. He was often teamed one-on-one with the opposition's best receiver. The Saskatchewan Roughriders announced his retirement on February 25, 2010. On August 20, 2015, he was inducted into the Canadian Football Hall of Fame.

References

External links
 Player profile of Eddie Davis

1973 births
Living people
American football defensive backs
Birmingham Barracudas players
Calgary Stampeders players
Canadian football defensive backs
Canadian Football Hall of Fame inductees
Northern Illinois Huskies football players
Players of American football from St. Louis
Players of Canadian football from St. Louis
Saskatchewan Roughriders players